Francisco Pérez-Bannen (born Francisco Pérez Bannen on January 16, 1971, in Santiago) is a Chilean film and television actor.

Biography
Pérez-Bannen studied at Colegio Verbo Divino school and in 1992 joined Escuela Fernando González to study acting. Years later he decided to unite his surnames Pérez (from his father's side) and Bannen (from his mother's side).

He debuted  in television with the telenovela Loca Piel (1996) and is best known for his roles in Aquelarre, Alguien Te Mira and films like Sexo con Amor and Padre nuestro. Recently, Pérez-Bannen debuted as a television presenter with the theatre-comedy show Improvisa o Muere.

Filmography

Films
 Thursday Till Sunday (2012)
 Paréntesis (2005) - Camilo
 Padre nuestro (2005) - Roberto
 Mujeres Infieles (2004)
 Sexo con Amor (2003) - Valentín

TV series
 El Cuento del Tío (TVN, 2005) "El Ofertón" - Aníbal
 El Socio''' (TVN, 2004) - Julián Pardo
 Te Llamabas Rosicler (TVN, 2002) - José Eduardo
 El Niño que Enloqueció de Amor (TVN, 1998) - Jorge
 Mi Abuelo mi Nana y Yo (TVN, 1998)

Telenovelas
 TVN
 Loca Piel (1996) - Vicente Yávar
 Tic Tac (1997) - Nicolás Urrutia
 Borrón y Cuenta Nueva (1998) - Pascual Bianchi
 Aquelarre (1999) - Toro Mardones
 Santoladrón (2000) - Rodrigo Carpio
 Amores de Mercado (2001) - Jonathan Muñoz
 Purasangre (2002) - Manuel Figueroa
 Pecadores (2003) - Radamés Pérez Soto
 Destinos Cruzados (2004) - Gaspar Goycolea
 Versus (2005) - Juano Torrejón
 Cómplices (2006) - Guillermo Zavala
 Disparejas (2006) - Daniel Castro
 Alguien Te Mira (2007) - Benjamín Morandé
 Amor por Accidente (2007) - Gustavo Arancibia
 Hijos del Monte (2008) - José Del Monte
 Los Angeles de Estela (2009) - Danilo Escobar
 40 y Tantos (2010) - Marco Elizalde
 Su Nombre es Joaquín (2011) - Alonso Montero
 Dama y Obrero (2012) - Julio Ulloa

 Canal 13 
 Secretos en el Jardín (2013) - Ramiro Opazo
 My little dilemma (2014) - Sergio
 Veinteañero a los 40 (2015) - Francisco Javier Bustamante Lynch

TV shows
 Improvisa o Muere'' (TVN, 2010) - Host

References

External links
 

1971 births
Chilean male film actors
Chilean male television actors
Chilean male telenovela actors
Chilean television presenters
Chilean people of Scottish descent
Living people
Male actors from Santiago
Colegio del Verbo Divino alumni
Chilean television personalities